Greenland was a European Parliament constituency for elections in the European Union covering the territory of Greenland. It seceded from the European Community in 1985. It was represented by one Member of the European Parliament.

Members of the European Parliament

Elections

1979

The 1979 European election was the first election to the European Parliament. The vote was held on 9 June 1979. The eligible electorate was 29,188. Finn Lynge of Siumut was elected.

1984

The 1984 European election was the second election to the European Parliament and the second for Greenland. The vote was held on 14 June 1984, and the eligible electorate was 34,653. Finn Lynge was re-elected. When Greenland seceded from the European Community on 1 January 1985 Lynge's seat was transferred to the Danish Socialist People's Party.

See also

 Accession of Iceland to the European Union
 Enlargement of the European Union
 Representation of Greenland, Brussels
 Greenland–European Union relations
 1982 Greenlandic European Economic Community membership referendum
 Norway–European Union relations

References

External links
 European Election News by European Election Law Association (Eurela)

Politics of Greenland
History of Greenland
European Parliament constituencies in Denmark
1979 establishments in Greenland
1985 disestablishments in Greenland
Constituencies established in 1979
Constituencies disestablished in 1985
Greenland–European Union relations
Former European Parliament constituencies